The 2008 U.S. embassy attack in Yemen in Sana'a, Yemen on September 17, 2008, resulted in 18 deaths and 16 injuries. Six attackers, six Yemeni police and six civilians were killed. This attack was the second occurring in the same year, after a mortar attack earlier in 2008 on March 18 missed the embassy and instead hit a nearby girls' school. Islamic Jihad of Yemen, an al Qaeda affiliate, claimed responsibility for the attack.

The attack
The attack began at 09:15 a.m. local time (06:15 a.m. UTC) when attackers dressed as policemen, armed with rocket-propelled grenades, automatic rifles, grenades and car bombs, attacked the outer security ring at the entrance of the main gate from a car. The embassy, located in the Dhahr Himyar district of Sana'a, is located 250 meters (820 feet) from this security entrance.  A 20-minute battle ensued between the terrorists and the embassy security force, during which some embassy security forces were fired upon by snipers from across the road. In the midst of the battle, a car bomb exploded at a second security ring of concrete blocks in an unsuccessful attempt to blow a hole in the wall. Up to five explosions may have occurred during the attack.

Six members of the Yemeni security forces, six attackers (one of whom wore an explosives belt), and six civilians were killed in the attack. Though no Americans employed within the embassy were killed during the attack, Susan el-Baneh, a newly married woman from New York City, was killed along with her Yemeni husband while waiting outside to fill out paperwork. At least seventeen people, mostly women and children, were treated at two hospitals for injuries.

Lackawanna, New York Yemeni-American Susan el-Baneh (Elbaneh), age 18, wed a Yemeni in August. She went to Yemen partly to help her new Yemeni husband obtain approval to enter the United States, and both spouses were in a line of civilians waiting to enter the embassy when the attackers opened fire. The Associated Press said Susan Elbaneh was a cousin of Jaber A. Elbaneh, who is on the FBI's list of most wanted terrorism suspects. Elbaneh's family said she had no relationship with her cousin and her sister Shokey Elbaneh commented "Like the people killed in 9/11, people killed in terrorist acts all over the place, we're the same victims."

Responsibility and arrests

The Islamic Jihad of Yemen, an al Qaeda affiliate, has claimed responsibility for the attacks.  The group also threatened future attacks against other embassies, including those of Saudi Arabia, the United Arab Emirates and the United Kingdom.

It released a statement: "We will carry out the rest of the series of attacks on the other embassies that were declared previously, until our demands are met by the Yemeni government."  Meanwhile, on September 18, 2008, Yemeni authorities arrested 30 suspects allegedly connected to Al-Qaeda. Foreign Minister Abou Bakr al-Qurbi said: "The attack on the U.S. Embassy was retaliation by al-Qaeda for the measures taken by the government to fight the terrorists." United States Department of State spokesman Sean McCormack said that "the multi-phased attack bore all the hallmarks of al-Qaeda."

On November 1, a Yemeni security official said the attackers had links to al-Qaida. He added that the United Nations had raised its security level in Yemen in response to such threats. He also elaborated that the six Yemeni men who carried out the attack trained at al-Qaida camps in the southern Yemeni provinces of Hadramut and Marib, while three of them had recently returned from fighting in Iraq.

Other incidents

In June 2001, the embassy was closed temporarily after militants were found with explosives and maps of the area, around the embassy.

On January 26, 2009, three gunmen in a car opened fire at a checkpoint near the embassy. Security forces chased them and managed to stop the car. All three men were arrested and there were no injuries.

See also

 2021 attack on the United States embassy in Yemen
 List of terrorist incidents, 2008
 United States–Yemen relations

References

2008 murders in Yemen
Mass murder in 2008
Car and truck bombings in Yemen
Mass shootings in Yemen
Suicide bombings in Yemen
Terrorist incidents attributed to al-Qaeda in the Arabian Peninsula
Yemen
Terrorist incidents in Yemen in 2008
21st century in Sanaa
2008 in international relations
United States–Yemen relations
Attacks on diplomatic missions in Yemen
September 2008 events in Asia
Crime in Sanaa